Azerbaijan–Gambia relations are the bilateral relations between Azerbaijan and The Gambia. Neither country has a resident ambassador.

Diplomatic relations 
On November 11, 1994, the Protocol on the establishment of diplomatic relations between the two states was signed.

According to the Order of President of Azerbaijan Ilham Aliyev dated December 11, 2012 No. 2587, Tariq Ismail oglu Aliyev was appointed as an Extraordinary Ambassador of Azerbaijan to the Gambia.

High-level visits 
On June 10–11, 2008, Osman Badji, the Gambian Ambassador to Azerbaijan, attended the international forum "Expanding the role of women in intercultural dialogue" held in Baku. 

On October 6–8, 2008, the IV Conference of Ministers of education of the Organization of Islamic Cooperation member states was held in Baku. During the conference, Secretary of state for education, research, science and technology of the Gambia Crispin Gray-Conson met with Azerbaijani Foreign Minister Elmar Mammadyarov.

On October 13–15, 2009, a delegation led by Hassum Kisay, Director of the Gambia's National Copyright center for art and culture, visited Azerbaijan to participate in the VI Conference of the Ministers of Culture of the OIC member States in Baku. Within the framework of the event, Hassum Kisay was received by Ilham Aliyev together with heads of delegations of the OIC member States. 

On April 10–14, 2010, the Minister of Foreign Affairs, international cooperation and work with Gambians living abroad, Osman Kammeh, paid an official visit to Azerbaijan. During the visit, O. Kammeh met with Ilham Aliyev,  E. Mammadyarov, Minister of Agriculture I. Abbasov, Deputy Minister of Industry and Energy N. Abbasov, and Minister of Education M. Mardanov. Prospects for developing cooperation in such areas as healthcare, education, tourism, energy, agriculture, culture, fishing, military, oil industry, geophysics, etc. were discussed. 

On May 18, 2010, within the framework of the 37th session of the Council of Foreign Ministers of the Organization of the Islamic Conference, held in Tajikistan, Azerbaijani MFA met with the Gambian MFA and discussed the current state of bilateral relations. 

In order to participate in the second meeting of the Ministers of Labor of the Organization of Islamic Cooperation member states, held on April 23–26, 2013 in Baku, a delegation headed by the Minister of labor of the Gambia Kebba S. Turay visited Azerbaijan.

In June 2018 there was a meeting between Mr. Mammadyarov and Gambian MFA, Ousainou Darboe.

Economic cooperation 
According to statistics from the United Nations Trade Office (COMTRADE), in 2015, the volume of exports from Azerbaijan amounted to 11.03 thousand US dollars.

International cooperation 
In the international arena, cooperation is carried out within the framework of various international organizations, including the Organization of Islamic Cooperation and the UN.

At the vote held on March 14, 2008 within the framework of the 62nd session of the UN General Assembly in connection with the draft resolution submitted by Azerbaijan "On the situation in the occupied territories of Azerbaijan", the government of the Gambia supported the position of Azerbaijan.

See also  
 Foreign relations of Azerbaijan
 Foreign relations of the Gambia

References